Bare Mountain is a summit located in Herkimer County, New York in the Adirondack Mountains. It is located north-northwest of Minnehaha in the Town of Webb. Flatrock Mountain is located southeast of Bare Mountain.

References

Mountains of Herkimer County, New York
Mountains of New York (state)